Moomomi is a Nature Conservancy preserve located on the northwestern shore of Molokai in Hawaii. It was established in 1988. This area is dry and hot, primarily denuded of soil due to overgrazing and poor land use practices over the last 150 years.

Moomomi preserve protects some of the very last intact coastal shrublands in Hawaii. The Moomomi preserve contains sand dunes, lithified sand formations, rare endemic Hawaiian coastal plant species, nesting seabirds and green sea turtles (Chelonia mydas), and the occasional Hawaiian monk seal (Monachus schauinslandi). An endangered bee species, Hylaeus hilaris, is only known from here.

Within the preserve, over 22 native plant species can be found including akoko (Euphorbia skottsbergii), nehe (Lipochaeta integrifolia), Tetramolopium rockii, hinahina kū kahakai  (Heliotropium anomalum var. argenteum), kolokolo kahakai (Vitex rotundifolia), pōhuehue (Ipomoea pes-caprae brasiliensis), pāūohiiaka (Jacquemontia ovalifolia sandwicensis), naupaka (Scaevola spp.), enaena (Pseudognaphalium sandwicensium var. molokaiense), and many others. Access to Moomoni Preserve is available during Nature Conservancy guided tours.

References

Further reading

External links 

The Nature Conservancy: Why you should visit Moomomi
Images of Moomomi on Hawaii Ecosystems At Risk

Nature reserves in Hawaii
Protected areas of Molokai
Nature Conservancy preserves
Protected areas established in 1988
1988 establishments in Hawaii